USS James Monroe (SSBN-622), a  ballistic missile submarine, was the only ship of the United States Navy to be named for Founding Father and U.S. president James Monroe.  She served with the United States Navy from 1963 to 1990.

Construction and commissioning
The contract to build James Monroe was awarded to Newport News Shipbuilding and Dry Dock Company in Newport News, Virginia on 3 February 1961 and her keel was laid down there on 31 July 1961.  She was launched on 4 August 1962, sponsored by Mrs. Miriam Thorne Gilpatric, wife of Deputy Secretary of Defense Roswell L. Gilpatric, and commissioned on 7 December 1963, with Commander William H. Sandford in command of the Blue Crew and Commander Warren R. Cobean, Jr., in command of the Gold Crew.

Operational history
Following shakedown off Florida's Cape Kennedy, James Monroe spent the early months of 1964 in ballistic missile tests. She departed for her first deterrent patrol in June 1964. On 17 January 1967, James Monroe completed her twelfth deterrent patrol, having operated from both Holy Loch, Scotland, and Rota, Spain. Preparations for the arrival of the submarine squadron went forward with haste throughout the remainder of 1978 and into 1979. Commander Submarine Squadron 16 greeted the submarine tender , when she arrived at Kings Bay on 2 July 1979. Four days later, USS James Monroe entered Kings Bay and moored alongside Simon Lakes starboard side to begin a routine refit in preparation for another nuclear weapons deterrence patrol.

Decommissioning and disposal
James Monroe was decommissioned on 25 September 1990 and stricken from the Naval Vessel Register the same day. Ex-James Monroe entered the Nuclear Powered Ship and Submarine Recycling Program in Bremerton, Washington. Recycling of Ex-James Monroe was completed on 10 January 1995.

References

External links

Lafayette-class submarines
Cold War submarines of the United States
Nuclear submarines of the United States Navy
1962 ships
Ships built in Newport News, Virginia
Ships named for Founding Fathers of the United States